Beta-cyclopiazonate dehydrogenase is an enzyme that catalyzes the chemical reaction

beta-cyclopiazonate + acceptor  alpha-cyclopiazonate + reduced acceptor

Thus, the two substrates of this enzyme are beta-cyclopiazonate and an acceptor, whereas its two products are alpha-cyclopiazonate and a reduced acceptor.

This enzyme belongs to the family of oxidoreductases, specifically those acting on X-H and Y-H to form an X-Y bond with other acceptors.  The systematic name of this enzyme class is beta-cyclopiazonate:acceptor oxidoreductase (cyclizing). Other names in common use include beta-cyclopiazonate oxidocyclase, beta-cyclopiazonic oxidocyclase, and beta-cyclopiazonate:(acceptor) oxidoreductase (cyclizing).  It employs one cofactor, FAD.

References

 
 

EC 1.21.99
Flavoproteins
Enzymes of unknown structure